Ferenc Keszthelyi, O. Cist (16 March 1928 – 6 December 2010) was the Roman Catholic Bishop Emeritus of the Roman Catholic Diocese of Vác, Hungary.

Born in Eger, he was ordained on 2 April 1951, aged 23 in the Order of Cistercians. On 11 February 1992, aged 63, he was appointed Bishop of Vác, and ordained the following month.

On 27 March 2003, aged 75, he retired and became Bishop Emeritus. He died on 6 December 2010, aged 82.

Notes

Bishops of Vác
20th-century Roman Catholic bishops in Hungary
21st-century Roman Catholic bishops in Hungary
1928 births
2010 deaths
Hungarian Cistercians